The 46th Parliament of Australia was a meeting of the legislative branch of the Australian federal government, composed of the Australian Senate and the Australian House of Representatives. The 2019 federal election gave the Coalition of the Liberal and National Parties control of the House, originally with a three-seat majority, allowing their leader Scott Morrison to stay in office as the 30th Prime Minister of Australia. The 46th Parliament was opened in Canberra on 2 July 2019 and was dissolved by the Governor General David Hurley on 11 April 2022.

2019 federal election

House of Representatives
At the 2019 election, in the 151-seat House of Representatives, the incumbent Coalition government was reelected with 77 seats, a majority of two seats. The Labor opposition won 68 seats. Six other MPs were elected to the crossbench, with the Greens, Centre Alliance, Katter's Australian Party, and independents Andrew Wilkie, Helen Haines and Zali Steggall winning a seat each.

Senate
In the Senate, 40 of 76 seats were up for election. Following the election, the Coalition had a total of 35 seats, four short of a majority. Labor held 26 seats, the Greens held 9 seats, Centre Alliance and One Nation each held two seats, the Jacqui Lambie Network held one and one seat was held by independent Cory Bernardi, who deregistered the party he was previously a member of on 25 June 2019.

Major events
 2 July 2019: Parliament is opened by the newly appointed Governor-General, David Hurley.
 25 July 2019: The government’s legislation repealing provisions allowing the medical transfer to Australia of refugees passes the lower house, despite vociferous objection by Labor and other minor party MPs. The original legislation’s passage in the previous parliament represented the first time a government had lost a substantial vote in the House of Representatives in 90 years.
 24 November 2019: Channel 9’s 60 Minutes program airs a report alleging that a Chinese intelligence group offered one million dollars to pay for the political campaign of a Liberal Party member to run in an eastern suburbs seat, as part of an operation to place a Chinese agent in Parliament. The Australian Security Intelligence Organisation later confirms the legitimacy of the story and reveals an ongoing investigation into the matter. See the 2019 Australian Parliament infiltration plot article for further details.
 3 February 2020: The Deputy Leader of the National Party Bridget McKenzie resigns from her leadership position and from Cabinet amidst a "sports rorts affair" that sees McKenzie oversee a community sports grants program that appears to be politically biased toward clubs located in marginal or target seats for the Government. At the subsequent leadership spill Deputy Prime Minister Michael McCormack narrowly avoids being removed from the position after being challenged by Barnaby Joyce.
 23 February 2021: Liberal MP Craig Kelly resigns from the Liberal Party to sit on the crossbench as an independent, reducing the Liberal/National government to a one-seat majority. He confirms he will continue to support the government on confidence and supply. Kelly later joins Clive Palmer's United Australia Party, becoming its "leader."

March 2020 coronavirus suspension
Around 23 March 2020, Parliament was suspended due to the COVID-19 pandemic in Australia; an adjournment rather than prorogation. Parliamentary sittings were shut down and scheduled to resume in August.  Its committees would continue to operate using technology. This unprecedented move was accompanied by two motions raised by the Attorney-General of Australia, Christian Porter, and passed on 23 March 2020. One motion was designed to allow MPs to participate in parliament by electronic means, if agreed by the major parties and the speaker; the second determined that with the agreement of the two major parties, the standing orders could be amended without requiring an absolute majority. (Shortly before this, a special intergovernmental decision-making forum, the National Cabinet, composed of the head of the Commonwealth (the Prime Minister) and the premiers and chief ministers of the Australian states and territories was established on 18 March 2020 to coordinate the national response to the pandemic.)

Major legislation
 The Treasury Laws Amendment (Tax Relief So Working Australians Keep More Of Their Money) Bill 2019 passes the parliament on 4 July 2019. The legislation, providing $158 billion in income tax cuts, was the government's signature election policy. Despite opposing Stage 3 of the legislation, which would flatten the tax rate to 30% for all workers earning between $45,000 and $200,000, Labor votes in favour of the bill and only the Greens vote against the bill at the third reading.
 The Counter-Terrorism (Temporary Exclusion Orders) Bill 2019 and related legislation passes the parliament on 25 July 2019. The legislation gives the Minister the power to block a person aged over 14 years of age (including an Australian citizen) from returning to Australia for up to two years if the minister “suspects on reasonable grounds” that a temporary exclusion order would prevent support or assistance to a terrorist organisation. The government refused to support all the amendments recommended by the Parliamentary Joint Committee on Intelligence and Security and supported by Labor, leading to concerns regarding the constitutional validity of the bill.

Membership changes
This table lists members of the House or Senate who resigned, died, were elected or appointed, or otherwise changed their party affiliation during the 46th Parliament.

See also
 45th Parliament of Australia
 47th Parliament of Australia
 Morrison Government
 2020s in Australian political history

Notes

References

Parliament of Australia